The 1984–85 Serie C1 was the seventh edition of Serie C1, the third highest league in the Italian football league system.

Overview

Serie C1/A
It was contested by 18 teams, and Brescia won the championship. It was decided that Brescia, Lanerossi Vicenza was promoted to Serie B, and Jesina, Asti T.S.C., Pistoiese, Treviso was demoted in Serie C2.

Serie C1/B
It was contested by 18 teams, and Catanzaro won the championship. It was decided that Catanzaro, Palermo was promoted to Serie B, and Reggina, Francavilla, Akragas, Nocerina was demoted in Serie C2.

League standings

Serie C1/A

Serie C1/B

External links
Italy Championship 1984/85 at RSSSF

Serie C1 seasons
3
Italy